The Indooroopilly Island Conservation Park is a protected conservation park that is located on an island in the Brisbane River, in Brisbane, Queensland, Australia.

Vegetation on the island consists of two species of mangroves and forest red gum eucalyptus trees. Weeds pose a threat to the ecology of the island and the survival of the flying fox colony. In summer, the island may contain as many as several hundred thousand flying foxes. Other species include several species of birds, including bush turkeys, as well as snakes. The island is significant to the local Aboriginal people, the Yugara people.

See also

 Protected areas of Queensland

References

External links
Queensland EPA Indooroopilly Island Conservation Park Management Plan(pdf)

Conservation parks of Queensland
1995 establishments in Australia
Protected areas established in 1995
Indooroopilly, Queensland